Autonomous Regional Party is a former regional political party in Primorje-Gorski Kotar County of Croatia.

Sources
Cijela Autonomna regionalna stranka prešla u HNS

External links
Official website

Political parties established in 2003
Regionalist parties in Croatia
Defunct political parties in Croatia
Political parties disestablished in 2017